Proof of work (PoW) is a form of cryptographic proof in which one party (the prover) proves to others (the verifiers) that a certain amount of a specific computational effort has been expended.  Verifiers can subsequently confirm this expenditure with minimal effort on their part.  The concept was invented by Moni Naor and Cynthia Dwork in 1993 as a way to deter denial-of-service attacks and other service abuses such as spam on a network by requiring some work from a service requester, usually meaning processing time by a computer. The term "proof of work" was first coined and formalized in a 1999 paper by Markus Jakobsson and Ari Juels.  

Proof of work was later popularized by Bitcoin as a foundation for consensus in a permissionless decentralized network, in which miners compete to append blocks and mint new currency, each miner experiencing a success probability proportional to the computational effort expended. PoW and PoS (proof of stake) remain the two best known Sybil deterrence mechanisms. In the context of cryptocurrencies they are the most common mechanisms.

A key feature of proof-of-work schemes is their asymmetry: the work – the computation – must be moderately hard (yet feasible) on the prover or requester side but easy to check for the verifier or service provider. This idea is also known as a CPU cost function, client puzzle, computational puzzle, or CPU pricing function. Another common feature is built-in incentive-structures that reward allocating computational capacity to the network with value in the form of money. 

The purpose of proof-of-work algorithms is not proving that certain work was carried out or that a computational puzzle was "solved", but deterring manipulation of data by establishing large energy and hardware-control requirements to be able to do so.  Proof-of-work systems have been criticized by environmentalists for their energy consumption.

Background
One popular system, used in Hashcash, uses partial hash inversions to prove that computation was done, as a goodwill token to send an e-mail. For instance, the following header represents about 252 hash computations to send a message to calvin@comics.net on January 19, 2038:

 X-Hashcash: 1:52:380119:calvin@comics.net:::9B760005E92F0DAE

It is verified with a single computation by checking that the SHA-1 hash of the stamp (omit the header name X-Hashcash: including the colon and any amount of whitespace following it up to the digit '1') begins with 52 binary zeros, that is 13 hexadecimal zeros:

 0000000000000756af69e2ffbdb930261873cd71

Whether PoW systems can actually solve a particular denial-of-service issue such as the spam problem is subject to debate;
the system must make sending spam emails obtrusively unproductive for the spammer, but should also not prevent legitimate users from sending their messages. In other words, a genuine user should not encounter any difficulties when sending an email, but an email spammer would have to expend a considerable amount of computing power to send out many emails at once. Proof-of-work systems are being used by other, more complex cryptographic systems such as bitcoin, which uses a system similar to Hashcash.

Variants 
There are two classes of proof-of-work protocols.

 Challenge–response protocols assume a direct interactive link between the requester (client) and the provider (server). The provider chooses a challenge, say an item in a set with a property, the requester finds the relevant response in the set, which is sent back and checked by the provider. As the challenge is chosen on the spot by the provider, its difficulty can be adapted to its current load. The work on the requester side may be bounded if the challenge-response protocol has a known solution (chosen by the provider), or is known to exist within a bounded search space.

 Solution–verification protocols do not assume such a link: as a result, the problem must be self-imposed before a solution is sought by the requester, and the provider must check both the problem choice and the found solution. Most such schemes are unbounded probabilistic iterative procedures such as Hashcash.

Known-solution protocols tend to have slightly lower variance than unbounded probabilistic protocols because the variance of a rectangular distribution is lower than the variance of a Poisson distribution (with the same mean).  A generic technique for reducing variance is to use multiple independent sub-challenges, as the average of multiple samples will have a lower variance.

There are also fixed-cost functions such as the time-lock puzzle.

Moreover, the underlying functions used by these schemes may be:
 CPU-bound where the computation runs at the speed of the processor, which greatly varies in time, as well as from high-end server to low-end portable devices.
 Memory-bound where the computation speed is bound by main memory accesses (either latency or bandwidth), the performance of which is expected to be less sensitive to hardware evolution.
 Network-bound if the client must perform few computations, but must collect some tokens from remote servers before querying the final service provider. In this sense, the work is not actually performed by the requester, but it incurs delays anyway because of the latency to get the required tokens.

Finally, some PoW systems offer shortcut computations that allow participants who know a secret, typically a private key, to generate cheap PoWs. The rationale is that mailing-list holders may generate stamps for every recipient without incurring a high cost. Whether such a feature is desirable depends on the usage scenario.

List of proof-of-work functions 
Here is a list of known proof-of-work functions:

 Integer square root modulo a large prime
 Weaken Fiat–Shamir signatures
 Ong–Schnorr–Shamir signature broken by Pollard
 Partial hash inversion This paper formalizes the idea of a proof of work and introduces "the dependent idea of a bread pudding protocol", a "re-usable proof-of-work" (RPoW) system.
 Hash sequences
 Puzzles
 Diffie-Hellman–based puzzle
 Moderate
 Mbound
 Hokkaido
 Cuckoo Cycle
 Merkle tree–based
 Guided tour puzzle protocol

Reusable proof-of-work 
Computer scientist Hal Finney built on the proof-of-work idea, yielding a system that exploited reusable proof of work (RPoW).
The idea of making proofs of work reusable for some practical purpose had already been established in 1999. Finney's purpose for RPoW was as token money. Just as a gold coin's value is linked to gold mining cost, the value of an RPoW token is guaranteed by the value of the real-world resources required to 'mint' a PoW token. In Finney's version of RPoW, the PoW token is a piece of Hashcash.

A website can demand a PoW token in exchange for service. Requiring a PoW token from users would inhibit frivolous or excessive use of the service, sparing the service's underlying resources, such as bandwidth to the Internet, computation, disk space, electricity, and administrative overhead.

Finney's RPoW system differed from a PoW system in permitting the random exchange of tokens without repeating the work required to generate them. After someone had "spent" a PoW token at a website, the website's operator could exchange that "spent" PoW token for a new, unspent RPoW token, which could then be spent at some third-party website similarly equipped to accept RPoW tokens. This would save the resources otherwise needed to 'mint' a PoW token. The anti-counterfeit property of the RPoW token was guaranteed by remote attestation. The RPoW server that exchanges a used PoW or RPoW token for a new one of equal value uses remote attestation to allow any interested party to verify what software is running on the RPoW server. Since the source code for Finney's RPoW software was published (under a BSD-like license), any sufficiently knowledgeable programmer could, by inspecting the code, verify that the software (and, by extension, the RPoW server) never issued a new token except in exchange for a spent token of equal value.

Until 2009, Finney's system was the only RPoW system to have been implemented; it never saw economically significant use.

RPoW is protected by private keys. Those keys are stored in the trusted platform module (TPM) hardware and by manufacturers holding TPM private keys. Stealing a TPM manufacturer's key or obtaining the key by examining the TPM chip itself would subvert that assurance.

Proof of useful work (PoUW) 

At the IACR conference Crypto 2022 researchers presented a paper describing Ofelimos, a blockchain protocol with a consensus mechanism based on "proof of useful work" (PoUW). Rather than miners consuming energy in solving complex, but essentially useless, puzzles to validate transactions, Ofelimos achieves consensus while simultaneously providing a decentralized optimization problem solver. The protocol is built around Doubly Parallel Local Search (DPLS), a local search algorithm that is used as the PoUW component. The paper gives an example that implements a variant of WalkSAT, a local search algorithm to solve Boolean problems.

Bitcoin-type proof of work 
In 2009, the Bitcoin network went online. Bitcoin is a proof-of-work digital currency that, like Finney's RPoW, is also based on the Hashcash PoW. But in Bitcoin, double-spend protection is provided by a decentralized P2P protocol for tracking transfers of coins, rather than the hardware trusted computing function used by RPoW. Bitcoin has better trustworthiness because it is protected by computation. Bitcoins are "mined" using the Hashcash proof-of-work function by individual miners and verified by the decentralized nodes in the P2P bitcoin network.

The difficulty is periodically adjusted to keep the block time around a target time.

Energy consumption 

Since the creation of Bitcoin, proof-of-work has been the predominant design of peer-to-peer cryptocurrency. Studies have estimated the total energy consumption of cryptocurrency mining. The PoW mechanism requires a vast amount of computing resources, which consume a significant amount of electricity. 2018 estimates from the University of Cambridge put Bitcoin’s energy consumption as equal to that of Switzerland.

History modification 
Each block that is added to the blockchain, starting with the block containing a given transaction, is called a confirmation of that transaction.  Ideally, merchants and services that receive payment in the cryptocurrency should wait for at least one confirmation to be distributed over the network, before assuming that the payment was done.  The more confirmations that the merchant waits for, the more difficult it is for an attacker to successfully reverse the transaction in a blockchain—unless the attacker controls more than half the total network power, in which case it is called a 51% attack.

ASICs and mining pools 
Within the Bitcoin community there are groups working together in mining pools. Some miners use application-specific integrated circuits (ASICs) for PoW. This trend toward mining pools and specialized ASICs has made mining some cryptocurrencies economically infeasible for most players without access to the latest ASICs, nearby sources of inexpensive energy, or other special advantages.

Some PoWs claim to be ASIC-resistant, i.e. to limit the efficiency gain that an ASIC can have over commodity hardware, like a GPU, to be well under an order of magnitude.  ASIC resistance has the advantage of keeping mining economically feasible on commodity hardware, but also contributes to the corresponding risk that an attacker can briefly rent access to a large amount of unspecialized commodity processing power to launch a 51% attack against a cryptocurrency.

Environmental concerns 

These miners compete to solve crypto challenges on the Bitcoin blockchain, and their solutions must be agreed upon by all nodes and reach consensus. The solutions are then used to validate transactions, add blocks and generate new bitcoins. Miners are rewarded for solving these puzzles and successfully adding new blocks. However, the Bitcoin-style mining process is very energy intensive because the proof of work shaped like a lottery mechanism. The underlying computational work has no other use. Miners have to waste a lot of energy to add a new block containing a transaction to the blockchain. Also, miners have to invest computer hardwares that need large spaces as fixed cost.

In January 2022 Vice-Chair of the European Securities and Markets Authority Erik Thedéen called on the EU to ban the proof of work model in favor of the proof of stake model due its lower energy emissions.

In November 2022 the state of New York enacted a two-year moratorium on cryptocurrency mining that does not completely use renewable energy as a power source for two years. Existing mining companies will be grandfathered in to continue mining without the use of renewable energy but they will not be allowed to expand or renew permits with the state, no new mining companies that do not completely use renewable energy will not also not be allowed to begin mining.

See also 
 Bitcoin
 Bitmessage
 Cryptocurrency
 Proof of authority
 Proof of burn
 Proof of personhood
 Proof of space
 Proof of stake
 Proof of elapsed time
 Ouroboros (protocol)
 Consensus (computer science)

Notes 
 On most Unix systems this can be verified with echo -n 1:52:380119:calvin@comics.net:::9B760005E92F0DAE | openssl sha1

References

External links 
 
 bit gold Bit gold. Describes a complete money system (including generation, storage, assay, and transfer) based on proof of work functions and the machine architecture problem raised by the use of these functions.
 Merkle Proof Standardised Format for Simplified Payment Verification (SPV).

Cryptography
Cryptocurrencies
Energy consumption